Bob van Luijt (born November 15, 1985) is a technology entrepreneur, technologist, and new media artist from the Netherlands. He is the co-founder of Weaviate and the chairman of the Creative Software Foundation.

Technology Entrepreneurship

In March 2016 Van Luijt started the open source vector search engine Weaviate. He has published and lectured about (open-source) software business models  and the positioning of broadly applicable infrastructure software (e.g., databases and search engines). During a presentation for TEDxUniversiteitVanAmsterdam he shared his ideas about how the evolvement of language impacts ideas in software development.

New Media & Arts

Van Luijt received a bachelor's degree from Artez Institute of the Arts. After completing his studies he created notable works that include The Core. He collaborated on harpist Anne Vanschothorst's album Ek is eik., with Billy Martin and Florian Weber and with Yonga Sun and Cuong Vu.

Control(human, data, sound) (CHDS) was his first tech-based artwork and was selected as an awards Finalist for CREATE 2015 in Pittsburgh, Pennsylvania, United States, in the category art+technology.

References

1985 births
Living people
Dutch artists
Dutch bloggers
Dutch businesspeople
People from Bergen op Zoom
Technology company founders